Dóra Czigány (born 23 October 1992) is a Hungarian female water polo player. At the 2012 Summer Olympics, she competed for the Hungary women's national water polo team in the women's event.

References

External links
 

Hungarian female water polo players
1992 births
Living people
Olympic water polo players of Hungary
Water polo players at the 2012 Summer Olympics
Water polo players at the 2016 Summer Olympics
21st-century Hungarian women